Pacific Heat is an Australian adult animated sitcom co-created by Rob Sitch, Santo Cilauro, and Tom Gleisner. The series is a Working Dog production for Foxtel's The Comedy Channel. The series, which was first commissioned by Foxtel in February 2014, premiered on The Comedy Channel on 27 November 2016. It was repeated on Network Ten on Monday 8 May for special preview and Eleven on Wednesday 10 May 2017.

Netflix started streaming the series on 2 December 2016 as a "Netflix Original". However, in early November 2020, it was announced that the series will be leaving the service sometime in December as they do not own the intellectual property rights to the show.

The series left Netflix on 2 December 2020, and is currently broadcast on Foxtel and Binge

Synopsis
Pacific Heat is set on the Gold Coast, Queensland, a sun-drenched paradise where sun and surf meet soaring crime rates. The police undercover special unit known as Pacific Heat tackles everyone from petty crooks to international drug cartels.

Voice cast
Rob Sitch as Special Agent Todd Sommerville
Santo Cilauro as Agent Zac
Tom Gleisner as the Chief
Rebecca Massey as Special Agent Maddie Riggs
Lucia Mastrantone as Special Agent Veronica V.J. Delane

Episodes

Broadcast
The series premiered on Netflix in the United States, United Kingdom, Ireland, and Canada on 2 December 2016, streaming all episodes simultaneously.

Reception
Pacific Heat has received generally negative reviews from critics. Review aggregator Rotten Tomatoes reported a 17% "rotten" rating. The critic consensus is yet to be reached. Metacritic reported a score of 27 out of 100 indicating "generally unfavorable reviews". The Guardian and The A.V. Club criticised the series, accusing it of imitating the art style of the American animated series Archer.

See also

Utopia
Have You Been Paying Attention?
List of Australian television series

References

External links

2016 Australian television series debuts
2010s Australian animated television series
2010s adult animated television series
Australian adult animated comedy television series
English-language television shows
The Comedy Channel original programming
Television shows set in Gold Coast, Queensland